Mount Holly is an unincorporated community and census-designated place (CDP) in Union County, Arkansas, United States. Mount Holly has a post office with ZIP code 71758. It was first listed as a CDP in the 2020 census with a population of 123.

Education
The Smackover-Norphlet School District (formerly the Smackover School District) operates public schools serving the community, including Smackover High School.

It was previously served by the Mount Holly School District, which operated Mt. Holly Elementary School and Mount Holly High School. On July 1, 2004, the former Mt. Holly district was consolidated into the Smackover district. For a period the district continued operating Mt. Holly Elementary. The Smackover district asked for permission from the Arkansas Board of Education to end operations of the Mount Holly School, and received the permission in 2006.

Demographics

2020 census

Note: the US Census treats Hispanic/Latino as an ethnic category. This table excludes Latinos from the racial categories and assigns them to a separate category. Hispanics/Latinos can be of any race.

Notable people 
 Thomas Chipman McRae, United States House of Representatives (1885 to 1903), 26th Governor of Arkansas.
 Charles Portis, novelist, author of True Grit was raised in Mount Holly

References

Unincorporated communities in Union County, Arkansas
Unincorporated communities in Arkansas
census-designated places in Union County, Arkansas
census-designated places in Arkansas